Ervin Eleskovic and Michael Ryderstedt were the defending champions, but they didn't compete this year.
Peter Luczak and Yuri Schukin won in the final 6–1, 6–7(6), [10–4], against Simone Vagnozzi and Uros Vico.

Seeds

Draw

Draw

References
 Doubles Draw

Tampere Open - Doubles
Tampere Open